Sport Vereniging La Fama (English:Sports Club) (known as SV La Fama) or simply La Fama is an Aruban football club based in Savaneta, who play in Aruba's first division. The club name of 'La Fama' is Spanish for 'The Fame'.

Achievements
Aruban Division di Honor: 1
2012-13

Aruban Division Uno: 2
1973, 2002

Torneo Copa Betico Croes: 0
 Finalist: 3
2009, 2020, 2021

Current squad
As of 10 September 2022

B Squad
The B Squad of La Fama is a team of children between the ages of 14 to 15. The highest achievement of this squad is 3rd place in the Arubian B League 2009/2010 and 1st place in the Copa Puppy Diaz Tournament. This team is one of the youngest teams on the B League.

Current technical staff

Staff and board members
 President:   Andres Garcia

Former Staff and board members
 Treasurer -  Giovanni S.G. Croes

References

External links
La Fama Official website 
Facebook page
Division di Honor

La Fama